Gossip is the double LP debut album by Australian rock group Paul Kelly and the Coloured Girls. Produced by Alan Thorne and Paul Kelly, it was released on Mushroom Records in September 1986, which peaked at No. 15 on the Australian Kent Music Report Albums Chart, and achieved gold record status. There was commercial success for "Before Too Long" which peaked at No. 15 and "Darling It Hurts" reached No. 25 on the related Singles Chart. Gossip was released in different forms, initially as a double album with 24 tracks, it was edited down to a single 15-track LP for North American and European release on A&M Records, when released on CD in North America, it featured 17 tracks.

At the 1986 Countdown Australian Music Awards the album was nominated for Best Australian Album.

Paul Kelly and the Coloured Girls had been named for a lyric in Lou Reed's song "Walk on the Wild Side", but all North American and European releases were credited to Paul Kelly and the Messengers due to possible racist interpretations. "Darling It Hurts" peaked at No. 19 on the Billboard Mainstream Rock Chart in 1987. The initial 1987 Australian CD release contained 21 tracks; in 2005, a special deluxe 2-CD version was released in Australia which contained all 24 tracks. In October 2010, it was listed at No. 7 in the book, 100 Best Australian Albums.

Background
After relocating from Melbourne to Sydney in 1985, Paul Kelly had recorded and released a solo album Post. Kelly then began to play and record with a full-time band, which included Michael Armiger on bass guitar, Michael Barclay on drums, Steve Connolly on guitar, eventually bassist Jon Schofield, and keyboardist Peter Bull joined. Through a joke based on Lou Reed's song "Walk on the Wild Side", the band became known as Paul Kelly and the Coloured Girls. Their first release was "From St Kilda to Kings Cross" but it did not chart. The line-up of the Coloured Girls changed rapidly with some stability late in 1985 as Barclay, Bull, Connolly and Schofield. Stuart Coupe, Kelly's manager, advised him to sign with Regular Records due to difficulty re-signing with Mushroom's Michael Gudinski. Michelle Higgins, Mushroom's Public relations officer, was a Kelly supporter and locked herself into a Sebel Townhouse Hotel room for nearly a week in mid-1986, refusing to leave until Gudinski had signed Kelly to a two-album recording contract.

In September 1986 Paul Kelly and the Coloured Girls released the 24-track double LP Gossip. The album included remakes of songs from Post and also featured "Maralinga (Rainy Land)", a song about the effects of British atomic testing on the Maralinga Tjarutja – indigenous people of Maralinga, South Australia. Gossip peaked at No. 15 on the Australian Kent Music Report Albums Charts, with singles chart success for "Before Too Long" which peaked at No. 15 and "Darling It Hurts" reaching No. 25. A single LP version of Gossip featuring 15 tracks was released in North America and Europe by A&M Records in July, 1987. Due to possible racist connotations the band changed its name, for international releases, to Paul Kelly and the Messengers. They made an American tour, initially supporting Crowded House and then head-lining, travelling across the United States by bus. "Darling It Hurts" peaked at No. 19 on the Billboard Mainstream Rock chart in 1987. The New York Times rock critic, John Pareles wrote "Mr. Kelly sang one smart, catchy three-minute song after another - dozens of them - as the band played with no-frills directness." following the band's performance at the Bottom Line Club in New York.

Track listing
All tracks written by Paul Kelly unless otherwise indicated.
 "Last Train to Heaven" – 4:51
 "Leaps and Bounds" (Paul Kelly, Chris Langman) – 3:25
 "Before the Old Man Died" – 2:35 Remixed by Scott Litt for North American issues
 "Down on My Speedway" – 3:25
 "White Train" – 2:47^^
 "Randwick Bells" – 3:38
 "Before Too Long" – 3:24
 "Adelaide" – 3:39^^ Omitted from North American LP and CD issues
 "I Won't Be Torn Apart" – 2:51 Omitted from North American LP issue
 "Going About My Father's Business" – 3:34 Omitted from North American LP issue
 "Somebody's Forgetting Somebody (Somebody's Letting Somebody Down)" – 3:41
 "The Ballroom" – 2:02 Omitted from North American LP and CD issues
 "Tighten Up" – 2:57 Remixed by Scott Litt for North American issues
 "I've Come for Your Daughter" – 3:21 Omitted from North American LP and CD issues, 1993 Australian CD issue
 "So Blue" – 3:32 Omitted from North American LP and CD issues
 "The Execution" – 5:17 Remixed by Scott Litt for North American issues
 "Incident on South Dowling" – 3:13^^
 "Maralinga (Rainy Land)" – 3:57 Omitted from North American LP and CD issues
 "Darling It Hurts" (Kelly, Steve Connolly) – 3:19
 "Look So Fine, Feel So Low" (Kelly, Maurice Frawley) – 3:22^^
 "Stories of Me" – 2:45
 "Don't Harm the Messenger" – 3:47
 "Gossip" (Kelly, Chris Coyne) – 2:56 Omitted from North American LP and CD issues, 1993 Australian CD issue
 "After the Show" – 3:17 Omitted from North American LP and CD issues, 1993 Australian CD issue

^^ = previously recorded on Kelly's 1985 solo release, Post

Personnel
Paul Kelly and the Coloured Girls
 Paul Kelly — acoustic guitar, vocals
 Michael Armiger — bass guitar (tracks 8, 14, 20)
 Michael Barclay — drums, vocals 
 Peter Bull — keyboards, vocals
 Steve Connolly — guitar, vocals
 Chris Coyne — saxophone, saxophone (tenor) (tracks 3, 4, 6, 9, 10, 19)
 John Schofield — bass, vocals

Additional musicians
 Richard Burgman — electric rhythm guitar
 Joe Camilleri — saxophone (track 3)
 Mike Cleary — piccolo trumpet
 Wayne Freer — trombone (tracks 3, 4, 6, 9, 10, 19)
 Graham Lee — pedal steel guitar (tracks 1, 11, 21)
 Grant McLennan — talking (track 21)
 Astrid Munday — vocals (tracks 7, 17)
 Brian Nixon — timpani
 Dianne Spence — saxophone (track 20)
 Chris Wilson — harmonica (tracks 1, 11, 16)

Recording details
 Producer — Alan Thorne, Paul Kelly
 Engineer — Alan Thorne
 Remixer — Scott Litt (tracks 3, 13, 16 for North American release)
2011 CD Remastered by Rick O'Neil at Turtlerock Mastering. 
Art work
 Cover Art — Ann Redmond
 Photography — Wayne O'Farrell

Charts

Certifications

Release history

References

1986 albums
Paul Kelly (Australian musician) albums
Mushroom Records albums